Lotus Park is a residential area in southern Durban, KwaZulu-Natal, South Africa.

References

Suburbs of Durban